Maa Ka Aanchal is a 1970 Bollywood drama film directed by Jagdev Bhambri. The film stars Sanjeev Kumar and Leela Mishra.

Plot 
The film revolves with the life of Shanti, A Kind-Hearted lady. she has the responsibility of her family hence dutiful to her Family Members. but her life changes after marriage.

Cast
Sanjeev Kumar as Bhagwan Dada  
Anjana Mumtaz
Abhi Bhattacharya   
Leela Mishra 
Master Ratan    
Johnny Whisky

Soundtrack

References

External links
 

1970 films
1970s Hindi-language films
1970 drama films
Films scored by Madan Mohan